"Romanoff and Juliet" is a 1964 Australian television play based on the play by Peter Ustinov.

It was part of Wednesday Theatre.

Plot
In a small European country, Judith, the daughter of the American ambassador, falls for the Igor, son of the Russia ambassador.

Cast
Raymond Westwell as the general
Judith Arthey as Juliet
Laurence Beck as Igor
Eric Reiman as Moulsworth
Wynn Roberts as Romanoff
Joan MacArthur as Beulah
Marion Edward as Evdokia
Terry Norris as the spy Mauve Monk
Fay Kelton as Martha
Bruce Barry as American boy
Dennis Miller and Clive Winmill as soldiers
Sheila Florence as Archbishop

Production
It was filmed in Melbourne.

Reception
The TV critic for the Sydney Morning Herald thought the production was similar to "a children's pantomime... however, a lot of it is lively and amusing enough to raise a smile."

References

External links
 

1964 television plays
1964 Australian television episodes
1960s Australian television plays
Wednesday Theatre (season 1) episodes
Soviet Union–United States relations